A by-election was held in the New South Wales state electoral district of Monara, also called Monaro, on 30 March 1865. No poll was required as William Grahame was the only candidate nominated. The by-election was triggered by the resignation of James Martin. At the 1864–65 New South Wales colonial election, Martin had been defeated at elections for East Sydney (22 November), Tumut (10 December) and Wellington (21 December), before being elected to both Monara (24 December) and The Lachlan (28 December). Martin chose to resign from Monara.

Dates

Result

James Martin had been elected to 2 seats and resigned from Monara to represent The Lachlan.

See also
Electoral results for the district of Monaro
List of New South Wales state by-elections

References

New South Wales state by-elections
1860s in New South Wales
1865 elections in Australia